The 2013–14 season was Galatasarays 110th in existence and 56th consecutive season in the Süper Lig. The club was aiming for an unprecedented twentieth league title, after winning the Süper Lig in the previous season.

In Europe, Galatasaray competed in the UEFA Champions League for a thirteenth season. They also competed in the Turkish Cup, entering in the fourth round, as well as the Turkish Super Cup.

This article shows statistics of the club's players in the season, and also lists all matches that the club played during the season. The season covered a period from 1 July 2013 to 30 June 2014.

Club

Board of Directors

Technical Staff

Medical Staff

   Anıl Işık

Grounds

Kit
Uniform Manufacturer: Nike

Chest Advertising's: Türk Telekom

Back Advertising's: Ülker

Arm Advertising's: Avea

Short Advertising's: HCL

Sponsorship
Companies that Galatasaray S.K. had sponsorship deals with during the season included the following.

Season overview
 At the end of the 2012–13 season, Galatasaray began official negotiations regarding the transfer of French centre-back Aurélien Chedjou from Lille. On 25 May 2013, it was reported that Chedjou had signed a four-year contract with Galatasaray. Galatasaray's original bid was reported as €6.3 million, with Chedjou set to receive a salary of €2.2 million per year.
 On 5 June 2013, Galatasaray signed Turkish midfielder Erman Kılıç. He had been out of contract from his last club Sivasspor, and was set to receive a salary of €380,000 (950,000 ) per year.
 On 6 June 2013, Galatasaray offered a new contract to left-back Hakan Balta. The club announced that the contract would be valid until 2016, with Balta set to receive a salary of €950,000 per year.
 On 21 June 2013, Galatasaray revealed the pre-season summer camp schedule on the website. The camp schedule for the Galatasaray professional football team prior to the next football season began on Monday, 1 July at the Florya Metin Oktay Facilities. On 8 July, the squad flew to Birmingham in England for an eight-day camp at the St George's Park National Football Centre. During the camp, Galatasaray played two friendlies against English teams. Following the second match, the club returned to Istanbul on 20 July before flying to Izmir the next day to play another friendly, against Málaga. On 29 July, Galatasaray played Napoli at the Stadio San Paolo to continue its summer camp. On 2 August, the club flew to London to participate in the Emirates Cup, hosted by Arsenal. Finally, on 11 August, Galatasaray returned to Istanbul to continue its preparations for the 2013 Turkish Super Cup against Fenerbahçe in a derby.
 On 2 July 2013, Galatasaray offered new contracts to centre-back Gökhan Zan and midfielder Engin Baytar. The club announced that the contracts would be valid until 2016 and that the two players would receive a salary of €850,000 per year. Also on the same day, goalkeeper Ufuk Ceylan was transfer listed by request.
 On 4 July 2013, Galatasaray did not offer a new contract to winger Aydın Yılmaz. There were no negotiations, and therefore he was not considered a first team player. Also on the same day, left-back Çağlar Birinci was released from the club.
 On 8 July 2013, Galatasaray announced the 23-man squad for the pre-season summer camp. Manager Fatih Terim did not add six players to the camp squad, all of which were either out of contract or transfer listed. Also on the same day, it was revealed that the club had parted ways with veteran Czech defender Tomáš Ujfaluši. He had been out of contract since 30 June and the club allegedly did not seek to extend his contract further.
 On 9 July 2013, it was announced that Galatasaray and Toulouse had reached an agreement for the transfer of Turkish striker Umut Bulut. He had spent been on at loan at Galatasaray during the previous season and managed to score fifteen goals in 38 matches. The original bid by Galatasaray was reported at €2.7 million. The contract would be valid until 2017 and Bulut was set to receive a salary of €1.7 million per year.
 On 16 July 2013, Galatasaray began official negotiations regarding the transfer of Brazilian midfielder Felipe Melo from Juventus. Melo had previously spent his last two seasons on loan at Galatasaray. On 20 July 2013, it was reported that Felipe Melo had signed a three-year contract with Galatasaray. The club's original bid was reported at €3.75 million, with Melo receiving a salary of €3.1 million per year.
On 19 July 2013, it was announced that midfielder Furkan Özçal would be loaned out for a year to Karabükspor. Galatasaray also received €100,000.
 On 28 July 2013, Galatasaray announced a sponsorship agreement with Indian IT company HCL Technologies. HCL would be advertised on Galatasaray's kit's shorts in exchange for $1.5 million per year.
 On 1 August 2013, it was announced that striker Sercan Yıldırım would be loaned out for a year to Şanlıurfaspor.
 On 4 August 2013, Galatasaray won the 2013 Emirates Cup, hosted by Arsenal.
 On 7 August 2013, it was announced that the contract of midfielder Emmanuel Culio had been terminated by Galatasaray.
 On 11 August 2013, as Süper Lig champions, Galatasaray began the season against the holders of the Turkish Cup, Fenerbahçe in the 2013 Turkish Super Cup. The match was played at Kadir Has Stadium. Galatasaray won the Super Cup title for a second consecutive year.
 On 21 August 2013, it was announced that striker Johan Elmander would be loaned out for a year to Norwich City. Galatasaray also received €1.67 million.
 On 22 August 2013, Galatasaray announced a sponsorship agreement with W Collection.
 On 22 August 2013, it was announced that manager Fatih Terim would also become the interim manager of the Turkey national team.
 Having won the league last season, Galatasaray began their UEFA Champions League campaign in the group stage. Courtesy of their UEFA coefficient, they were seeded in Pot 3 for the draw, which took place in Monaco on 29 August 2013. Galatasaray were drawn into Group B alongside Real Madrid, Juventus and Copenhagen. Galatasaray were previously drawn with Real Madrid and Juventus in group and knockout stages, while Copenhagen was a new opponent.
 On 2 September 2013, hours before the registration deadline for UEFA, Galatasaray began official negotiations regarding the transfer of Portuguese winger Bruma from Sporting CP.
 On 3 September 2013, it was reported that Bruma had signed a five-year contract with Galatasaray. The club's original bid was reported at €10 million, with Bruma set to receive a salary of €1 million per year.
 On 3 September 2013, two months after the previous contract offer, Aydın Yılmaz signed a new contract with Galatasaray until 2016. Aydın was set to receive a salary of €680,000 per year. On the same day, the club also renewed Aykut Erçetin's contract for another year.
 On 4 September 2013, it was announced that midfielder Colin Kazim-Richards would be transferred to Bursaspor for a €250,000 transfer fee.
 On 6 September 2013, it was announced that midfielder Erman Kılıç would be transferred to Eskişehirspor for a €200,000 transfer fee.
 On 12 September 2013, Galatasaray announced a sponsorship agreement with Fox International Channels.
 On 24 September 2013, Galatasaray announced the dismissal of head coach Fatih Terim.
 On 30 September 2013, Galatasaray announced their new head coach, Roberto Mancini. Mancini signed a three-year contract beginning from the 2013–14 season, and was set to receive a salary of €3.5 million per year.
 On 4 January 2014, it was announced that Engin Baytar would be loaned out to Çaykur Rizespor for the rest of the season.
 On 5 January 2014, Galatasaray began official negotiations regarding the transfer of Bosnian Izet Hajrović from Grasshopper.
 On 8 January 2014, it was announced that Galatasaray and Grasshopper had reached an agreement for the transfer of Izet Hajrović; the original bid was reported at €3.5 million. Galatasaray announced that the contract would last until 2018 and that Hajrović would receive a salary of €1.1 million per year.
 On 15 January 2014, Galatasaray began official negotiations regarding the transfer of Turkish player Salih Dursun from Kayserispor.
 On 15 January 2014, Galatasaray began official negotiations regarding the transfer of midfielder Umut Gündoğan from Bucaspor.
 On 15 January 2014, Galatasaray began official negotiations regarding the transfer of Endogan Adili from Basel.
 On 16 January 2014, Galatasaray began official negotiations regarding the transfer of Brazilian left-back Alex Telles from Grêmio.
 On 17 January 2014, it was announced that Galatasaray and Bucaspor had reached an agreement for the transfer of Umut Gündoğan. Galatasaray's original bid was reported at €550,000. The contract was set to last until 2018, with Gündoğan set to receive a salary of €200,000 for the second half of the season.
 On 17 January 2014, it was announced that Galatasaray and Kayserispor had reached an agreement for the transfer of right-back Salih Dursun. The original bid by Galatasaray was reported as €2.75 million. Galatasaray announced that the contract would remain until 2018 and that Salih would receive a salary of €200,000 for the second half of the season.
 On 21 January 2014, it was announced that Sercan Yıldırım had been loaned out to Bursaspor for the rest of the season.
 On 22 January 2014, it was announced that Galatasaray and Grêmio had reached an agreement for the transfer of Alex Telles. The original bid by Galatasaray was reported as €6.15 million. Galatasaray announced that the contract would remain until 2018 and that Telles would receive a salary of €650,000 for the second half of the season.
 On 27 January 2014, it was announced that Nordin Amrabat had been loaned out to Malaga for the remainder of the season.
 On 28 January 2014, it was announced that the contract of Albert Riera had been terminated.
 On 28 January 2014, Galatasaray announced a sponsorship agreement with Tacirler Forex for four and a half years.
 On 29 January 2014, it was announced that Galatasaray and Manisaspor had reached an agreement for the transfer of midfielder Oğuzhan Kayar. The original bid by Galatasaray was reported as €750,000.
 On 29 January 2014, it was announced that Bruma had been loaned out to Gaziantepspor for the remainder of the season.
 On 29 January 2014, Galatasaray began official negotiations regarding the transfer of centre-back Koray Günter from Borussia Dortmund.
 On 29 January 2014, Galatasaray began official negotiations regarding the transfer of Argentinian winger Lucas Ontivero from Centro Atlético Fénix.
 On 30 January 2014, it was announced that Galatasaray and Borussia Dortmund had reached an agreement for the transfer of Koray Günter. The original bid by Galatasaray was reported as €2.5 million. Galatasaray announced that the contract would remain until 2018 and that Günter would receive a salary of €300,000 for the second half of the season.
 On 31 January 2014, it was announced that Galatasaray and Centro Atlético Fénix had reached an agreement for the transfer of Lucas Ontivero. The original bid by Galatasaray was reported as €2 million. Galatasaray announced that the contract would remain until 2018 and that Lucas would receive a salary of €175,000 for the second half of the season.
 On 1 February 2014, it was announced that Dany Nounkeu had been loaned out to Beşiktaş for the rest of the season.
 On 2 February 2014, it was announced that Galatasaray and Boca Juniors had reached an agreement for the loaning in of centre-back Guillermo Burdisso.
 On 3 February 2014, Galatasaray began official negotiations regarding the transfer of defender Veysel Sarı from Eskişehirspor.
 On 3 February 2014, it was announced that Yiğit Gökoğlan had been loaned out to Kayseri Erciyesspor for the remainder of the season.
 On 3 February 2014, it was announced that Galatasaray and Eskişehirspor had reached an agreement for the transfer of Veysel Sarı. The original bid by Galatasaray was reported as €300,000. Galatasaray announced that the contract would remain until 2018 and that Veysel would receive a salary of €400,000 for the second half of the season.
 On 3 February 2014, it was announced that Galatasaray and Boca Juniors had reached an agreement for the loan of Guillermo Burdisso. The original bid by Galatasaray was reported as €185,000. Galatasaray announced that the contract would remain until the end of the season and that Burdisso would receive a salary of €300,000 for the second half of the season.
 On 19 February 2014, Galatasaray announced a sponsorship agreement with Microsoft.
 On 29 April 2014, Galatasaray made a link between Astana Presidential Sports Club to form a strategic alliance.

Players

Squad information

Transfers

In

Total spending:  €41.435M

Out

Total income:  €2.77M

Expenditure:  €38.665M

Competitions

Overall

Pre-season and friendlies

Standings
Each team played two matches, with three points awarded for a win, one point for a draw, and a point for every goal scored. In addition, shots on target were taken into account and were used to decide the tournament winners if teams were level on points and goal difference.

Turkish Super Cup

Süper Lig

League table

Results summary

Results by round

Matches

Turkish Cup

Standings

Final

The final was contested in a neutral ground as a one-off match. The winners were awarded fifty medals per club along with the Turkish Cup trophy.

UEFA Champions League

Group stage

Knockout phase

Round of 16

Statistics

Squad statistics

Statistics accurate as of 17 May 2014.

Goals
Includes all competitive matches.

Last updated on 17 May 2014

Disciplinary record

Overall

Attendance

 Sold season tickets: Stopped at 46,250. Demand was 165,000.

See also
 2013–14 Süper Lig
 2013–14 Turkish Cup
 2013–14 UEFA Champions League

References

Sources

External links
Galatasaray Sports Club Official Website 
Turkish Football Federation – Galatasaray A.Ş. 
uefa.com – Galatasaray AŞ

2013-14
2013–14 UEFA Champions League participants seasons
Turkish football clubs 2013–14 season
2013 in Istanbul
2014 in Istanbul
Galatasaray Sports Club 2013–14 season